Human Genomics and Proteomics was an open-access peer-reviewed academic journal that published papers in the fields of human genomics and proteomics, systems biology, and  personalized medicine. The editors-in-chief were George P. Patrinos (University of Patras) and Emanuel F. Petricoin (George Mason University). The journal was established in 2009 and is published by SAGE Publications. The last article appeared in October 2011.

Abstracting and indexing 
The journal was abstracted and indexed in:
 Academic Onefile
 Academic Search Complete
 EMBASE
 PubMed Central
 Scopus

External links 
 

SAGE Publishing academic journals
English-language journals
Medical genetics journals
Open access journals
Publications established in 2009
Defunct journals of the United States
Publications disestablished in 2011